Stewart Donald McInnes (July 24, 1937 – October 3, 2015) was a Canadian lawyer, arbitrator and federal politician.

Education
In 1954, while studying at Dalhousie University, he became a brother in the Sigma Chi fraternity, who later named him a Significant Sig.

Law career
From 1961 to 1999, McInnes was a senior partner in the Halifax, Nova Scotia law firm of McInnes Cooper, and appeared before the Supreme Court of Nova Scotia, the Federal Court of Canada and the Supreme Court of Canada. He also served as the president of the Nova Scotia branch of the Canadian Bar Association from 1983 to 1984.

Political career
In the 1984 general election, he was elected to the House of Commons of Canada as the Progressive Conservative Member of Parliament for Halifax, defeating Liberal Cabinet minister and former Premier of Nova Scotia Gerald Regan.

In 1985, he was appointed to Prime Minister Brian Mulroney's cabinet as Minister of Supply and Services. From 1986 until 1988, he concurrently held the positions of Minister of Public Works and Minister responsible for CMHC.

McInnes was defeated in the 1988 federal election by Liberal Mary Clancy due, in part, to the unpopularity of the Canada–United States Free Trade Agreement in Atlantic Canada. He returned to his law practice full-time.

After politics
He was a certified arbitrator and mediator and focused professionally in those areas after leaving politics. McInnes served as Director of the Arbitration and Mediation Institute of Canada from 1993 to 1995 and as director of the Atlantic Arbitration and Mediation Institute from 1993 to 1994. In 1996, he was on the International Mediation Centre’s advisory board, and in 1999, he was a panel member of the Canadian Foundation for Dispute Resolution. He has lectured and written extensively on the topic of mediation and arbitration.

After leaving the House of Commons, McInnes remained active in politics as a fundraiser for the Progressive Conservative Association of Nova Scotia.

McInnes died on October 3, 2015.

Archives 
There is a Stewart McInnes fonds at Library and Archives Canada.

Electoral record

References

External links

1937 births
2015 deaths
Schulich School of Law alumni
Canadian people of Scottish descent
People from Halifax, Nova Scotia
Lawyers in Nova Scotia
Canadian King's Counsel
Members of the King's Privy Council for Canada
Members of the House of Commons of Canada from Nova Scotia
Progressive Conservative Party of Canada MPs
Members of the 24th Canadian Ministry